Million Dollars to Kill Me is the fifth studio album by American punk rock band Joyce Manor, released on September 21, 2018 through Epitaph Records.

Background
The album's title stems from an interview with Blink-182 drummer Travis Barker, describing his dark mental state following his 2008 plane crash. The anecdote, which he notes in his memoir Can I Say, recounts when he offered a friend a million dollars to end his suffering. "It just stuck in my head, it's just the opposite of what everyone wants — money and to not die. It's super rock 'n' roll," said frontman Barry Johnson.

Million Dollars to Kill Me also marks the band's first album with drummer Pat Ware, also of the group Spraynard.

Critical reception
At Metacritic, a site that aggregates reviews from critics, gives the album 75 out of 100 based on 10 reviews, indicating "generally favorable reviews". Timothy Monger from Allmusic dubbed the album a "thoughtful and overall solid set." Pitchfork's Larry Fitzmaurice opined that the band's "willingness to expand the subtleties of their sound makes Million Dollars to Kill Me an enthralling listen, even at its lowest points." For Jenzia Burgos at Paste, she felt it lacked the "narrative depth" of previous records, while building musically to showcase their "slickest power pop yet."

Track listing

Personnel 
 Barry Johnson (vocals and guitar)
 Chase Knobbe (guitar)
 Pat Ware (drums)
 Matt Ebert (bass)

Chart positions

References

External links
 

2018 albums
Epitaph Records albums
Joyce Manor albums